WZBY is a radio station licensed to Grand Portage, Minnesota, broadcasting on 92.7 MHz FM.  The station serves the far northeastern tip of Minnesota along Lake Superior, and is owned by Multi-Cultural Diversity Radio, Inc.

History
The station is co-owned with WOTO-FM, which signed on at the same time. The license for WOTO was returned to the FCC. Multi-Cultural Diversity Radio, Inc. also owns stations in the Twin Cities, including KLCI, and WLKX.
The station could potentially upgrade to class C, which is the highest power class available for a radio station. The potential 100,000 watt signal would allow coverage into Thunder Bay in Canada, and along the North Shore of Lake Superior.
It is one of two newer radio stations operated by the same group.

References

External links

Radio stations in Minnesota
Radio stations established in 2021
2021 establishments in Minnesota